Milaș is a commune in Bistrița-Năsăud County, Transylvania, Romania. It is composed of six villages: Comlod (Komlód), După Deal (Hegymögött), Ghemeș (Gémestanya), Hirean (Hirántanya), Milaș, and Orosfaia (Oroszfája).

The commune sits on the Transylvanian Plateau. It is located in the southern corner of the county, on the border with Mureș County.

Natives
Iuliu Hossu (1885–1970), Greek Catholic prelate who served as the Bishop of Cluj-Gherla and was persecuted by the Communist authorities. He was beatified in 2019 by Pope Francis.

References

Communes in Bistrița-Năsăud County
Localities in Transylvania
Transylvanian Saxon communities